The 3rd Guards 'Kotelnikovo' Tank Division (Russian:3-я гвардейская танковая Котельниковская Краснознамённая ордена Суворова дивизия) (Military Unit Number 44181) was an armoured division of the Soviet Ground Forces, formed in 1945 and disestablished in 1989.

The division was formed from the previous 3rd Guards Tank Corps. At the beginning of the Battle of Narva (1944) in February 1944 the 3rd Guards Tank Corps was directly reporting to Leningrad Front, and was led by Major General I. A. Vovchenko.

The organisation of the division before being reduced:

 Division Headquarters, Zaslonovo, Lepel, Vitebsk
 430th Independent Communications Battalion
 33rd Independent Guards Reconnaissance Battalion
 3rd Guards Tank Regiment
 18th Guards Tank Regiment
 126th Guards Tank Regiment
 296th Guards Motorised Rifle Regiment
 733rd Artillery Regiment
 256th Independent Missile Battalion
 740th Anti-Aircraft Missile Regiment
 154th Independent Engineer-Sapper Battalion
 92nd Independent Equipment Maintenance and Recovery Battalion
 1018th Independent Materiel Supply Battalion
 160th Independent Medical Battalion
 Unknown Chemical Defence Company

In June 1989 it was reduced to a Weapons and Equipment Storage Base, and in November 1989 it was disbanded completely. It spent much of the Cold War based at Zaslonovo in the Byelorussian Soviet Socialist Republic/Belorussian Military District as part of the 7th Tank Army.

References

Michael Holm, 3rd Guards Tank Division

Tank divisions of the Soviet Union
Military units and formations disestablished in 1989